Glen Rogers High School was a high school in Glen Rogers, Wyoming County, West Virginia. It was closed in 1992 and consolidated into nearby Pineville High School and Oceana High School.

Glen Rogers High School's mascot was the "Owl" with its sporting teams called the "Owls".  The school colors were green and white.

Glen Rogers High School alma mater: "Glen Rogers High, Glen Rogers High, we love our high school, raise our banners high. We love our name, fight for our fame, victory forever is our aim".

Feeder schools for Glen Rogers High School included Glen Fork Elementary School, Glen Rogers Elementary School and John McGraw Elementary School.

History

Glen Rogers High School offered its first classes in 1928.
In 1929 Glen Rogers High School held its first graduation with two students, Kelly Barrett and Elizabeth Williams.
The first school yearbook, "The Owl," published in 1938 for a Senior Class of eight students.

A New school is built, to replace the earlier structure, in 1951 at a total cost for new structure is $172,750.

Glen Rogers High School varsity boys basketball team won the West Virginia Class A State Championship in 1977, defeating the then #1 ranked Gauley Bridge Travellers, 69-65.

Glen Rogers High School held its last graduation in 1992.  The school was closed and consolidated when enrollment in grades 9-12 dropped under 200 students.
In 2013 the school was demolished due to arson and ongoing vandalism.

Extracurricular activities

Glen Rogers High School offered many clubs and groups for its students.  Some of these were the Science Club, National Honor Society, Chorus, Future Business Leaders of America, Christian Youth Group, Quiz Bowl Team, Chess Club and the Varsity Club.  Additionally, over the years, the school offered various sports including boys and girls basketball, softball, football, baseball, cross country, cheerleading and golf.

Notable alumni

William C. Marland  ('35), Governor of West Virginia 1953-1957

References

External links
Glen Rogers High School group on Facebook

Defunct schools in West Virginia
Educational institutions disestablished in 1992
Former school buildings in the United States
School buildings completed in 1951
Schools in Wyoming County, West Virginia